Algoforma algoana is a species of moth of the family Tortricidae. It is found in South Africa.

The wingspan is 16–18 mm. The ground colour of the forewings is grey green with a black-brown subdorsal blotch.

References

Endemic moths of South Africa
Moths described in 1875
Tortricini
Moths of Africa